Henri Marie Raoul Brincard (18 November 1939 – 14 November 2014) was a French Roman Catholic bishop.

Ordained to the priesthood on 23 August 1975, Brincard was named bishop of the Le Puy-en-Velay on 8 August 1988 and was ordained bishop on 2 October 1988.

Notes

1939 births
2014 deaths
21st-century French Roman Catholic bishops
École Nationale des Chartes alumni
20th-century French Roman Catholic bishops